Miral Samardžić (born 17 February 1987) is a Slovenian footballer who plays as a centre-back for Emirati club Ajman.

Career

Club

Samardžić started playing football in his hometown Jesenice, aged 9. He started his professional career with Triglav Kranj. In early 2007, Samardžić signed for Maribor. Following four seasons with Maribor, he was signed by Moldovan team Sheriff Tiraspol in 2010, where he stayed for four seasons.

Rijeka
In July 2014, Samardžić signed for Rijeka in Croatia. He scored on his debut in Rijeka's 2–1 win against Dinamo Zagreb in the 2014 Croatian Supercup.

Henan Jianye
After two seasons with Rijeka, in June 2016, Samardžić transferred to Chinese Super League side Henan Jianye for a reported fee of €1.5 million.

Anzhi Makhachkala
On 31 August 2017, Anzhi Makhachkala announced the signing of Samardžić on a two-year contract.

Krylia Sovetov Samara
On 19 August 2018, Samardžić signed with another Russian Premier League club Krylia Sovetov Samara.

Olimpija Ljubljana
On 11 July 2019, Samardžić returned to Slovenia and signed with Olimpija Ljubljana.

International
Miral Samardžić was a member of the young Slovenian national team selections. He made a début for the senior national team on 19 November 2013 against Canada and has collected 15 caps for Slovenia between 2013 and 2017.

Career statistics

Club

International

References

External links

Slovenian Football Association profile 

1987 births
Living people
Slovenian people of Bosnia and Herzegovina descent
Sportspeople from Jesenice, Jesenice
Slovenian footballers
Slovenia youth international footballers
Slovenia under-21 international footballers
Slovenia international footballers
Slovenian expatriate footballers
Association football defenders
NK Triglav Kranj players
NK Maribor players
FC Sheriff Tiraspol players
HNK Rijeka players
Henan Songshan Longmen F.C. players
Akhisarspor footballers
FC Anzhi Makhachkala players
PFC Krylia Sovetov Samara players
NK Olimpija Ljubljana (2005) players
Hatta Club players
Ajman Club players
Slovenian Second League players
Slovenian PrvaLiga players
Moldovan Super Liga players
Croatian Football League players
Chinese Super League players
Süper Lig players
Russian Premier League players
UAE Pro League players
Expatriate footballers in Moldova
Expatriate footballers in Croatia
Expatriate footballers in China
Expatriate footballers in Turkey
Expatriate footballers in Russia
Expatriate footballers in the United Arab Emirates
Slovenian expatriate sportspeople in Moldova
Slovenian expatriate sportspeople in Croatia
Slovenian expatriate sportspeople in China
Slovenian expatriate sportspeople in Turkey
Slovenian expatriate sportspeople in Russia
Slovenian expatriate sportspeople in the United Arab Emirates